Harry J. Stein (born November 25, 1948) is an American author and columnist. , he is a contributing editor to the political magazine City Journal.

Biography
 
Stein graduated from New Rochelle High School in 1966 and Pomona College in May 1970. He later graduated from the Columbia University Graduate School of Journalism.

Stein wrote for Ramparts and New Times magazines in the 1970s, and originated Esquire "Ethics" column in the 1980s. During the 1990s he wrote a column on television ethics for TV Guide. As part of the New York media scene of the early 1980s he was a member of the inaugural Rotisserie League formed by Daniel Okrent.

He is the author of novels and memoirs, including satirical political commentary related to his transition from liberal to conservative viewpoints.  His first book, Tiny Tim, a biography of the entertainer, was published in 1976.

Stein's father, the late Joseph Stein, was a Broadway librettist/playwright, best known for Fiddler on the Roof.

Bibliography

Novels

Non-fiction 

Autobiographies
 
  (memoirs)
  (memoirs)

Biographies
  (with Tiny Tim)
  (with Peter Malkin) (or Eichmann in My Hands: A First-Person Account by the Israeli Agent Who Captured Hitler's Chief Executioner)
 

Politics
 
 
 

True events
 
 
 
 

Others
  (history)
  (philosophy)
  (guide)
  (opinion)

References

External links
 

American columnists
1948 births
Living people
Jewish American writers
Pomona College alumni
Columbia University Graduate School of Journalism alumni
Writers from New Rochelle, New York
Journalists from New York (state)
Manhattan Institute for Policy Research
21st-century American Jews
New Rochelle High School alumni